Pond was an unincorporated community in western St. Louis County, Missouri, United States. It was located on Old Manchester Road (part of the original alignment of U.S. Route 66), but has now been wholly incorporated into Wildwood. Pond was home to the Big Chief Hotel, now a historic landmark.

References

Unincorporated communities in St. Louis County, Missouri
Unincorporated communities in Missouri

Former cities in Missouri